Nipitphon Phuangphuapet (born 31 May 1991) is a Thai badminton player. He studies bachelor of Laws at Bangkok-Dhonburi University.

Achievements

Asian Championships 
Men's doubles

Southeast Asian Games 
Men's doubles

Mixed doubles

Summer Universiade 
Men's doubles

World Junior Championships 
Boys' doubles

Asian Junior Championships 
Boys' doubles

BWF World Tour (1 title, 1 runner-up) 
The BWF World Tour, which was announced on 19 March 2017 and implemented in 2018, is a series of elite badminton tournaments sanctioned by the Badminton World Federation (BWF). The BWF World Tour is divided into levels of World Tour Finals, Super 1000, Super 750, Super 500, Super 300 (part of the HSBC World Tour), and the BWF Tour Super 100.

Mixed doubles

BWF Superseries (2 runners-up) 
The BWF Superseries, which was launched on 14 December 2006 and implemented in 2007, was a series of elite badminton tournaments, sanctioned by the Badminton World Federation (BWF). BWF Superseries levels were Superseries and Superseries Premier. A season of Superseries consisted of twelve tournaments around the world that had been introduced since 2011. Successful players were invited to the Superseries Finals, which were held at the end of each year.

Men's doubles

  BWF Superseries Finals tournament
  BWF Superseries Premier tournament
  BWF Superseries tournament

BWF Grand Prix (2 titles, 2 runners-up) 
The BWF Grand Prix had two levels, the Grand Prix and Grand Prix Gold. It was a series of badminton tournaments sanctioned by the Badminton World Federation (BWF) and played between 2007 and 2017.

Men's doubles

Mixed doubles

  BWF Grand Prix Gold tournament
  BWF Grand Prix tournament

BWF International Challenge/Series (4 titles, 1 runner-up) 
Men's doubles

Mixed doubles

  BWF International Challenge tournament
  BWF International Series tournament

References

External links 
 
 

1991 births
Living people
Nipitphon Phuangphuapet
Nipitphon Phuangphuapet
Badminton players at the 2014 Asian Games
Badminton players at the 2018 Asian Games
Nipitphon Phuangphuapet
Competitors at the 2011 Southeast Asian Games
Competitors at the 2013 Southeast Asian Games
Competitors at the 2015 Southeast Asian Games
Competitors at the 2017 Southeast Asian Games
Competitors at the 2019 Southeast Asian Games
Nipitphon Phuangphuapet
Nipitphon Phuangphuapet
Southeast Asian Games medalists in badminton
Nipitphon Phuangphuapet
Universiade medalists in badminton
Medalists at the 2015 Summer Universiade
Nipitphon Phuangphuapet